Muangkan United Football Club (Thai: สโมสรฟุตบอลเมืองกาญจน์ ยูไนเต็ด) is a Thai professional football club based in Kanchanaburi Province.

History
In 2009 Muangkan United Football Club is formed as Muangkan Football Club, nicknamed The Bats. Home games to be played at Kanchanaburi Province Stadium. 

In 2010 the club join the professional league that was 2010 Regional League Division 2 Central & Eastern Region.

Stadium and locations

Season By Season Record

P = Played
W = Games won
D = Games drawn
L = Games lost
F = Goals for
A = Goals against
Pts = Points
Pos = Final position
N/A = No answer

QR1 = First Qualifying Round
QR2 = Second Qualifying Round
QR3 = Third Qualifying Round
QR4 = Fourth Qualifying Round
RInt = Intermediate Round
R1 = Round 1
R2 = Round 2
R3 = Round 3

R4 = Round 4
R5 = Round 5
R6 = Round 6
GR = Group stage
QF = Quarter-finals
SF = Semi-finals
RU = Runners-up
W = Winners

Honours

Domestic Leagues 
 Thai League 3
 Runners-up (1): 2020–21
 Thai League 3 Western Region
 Winners (1): 2020–21

References

External links 
 Official Website of Muangkan F.C.
 Official Facebook page of Muangkan United

Association football clubs established in 2009
Football clubs in Thailand
Kanchanaburi province
2009 establishments in Thailand